Juan Fernández (born 17 September 1963) is an Argentine biathlete. He competed in the men's 20 km individual event at the 1992 Winter Olympics.

References

1963 births
Living people
Argentine male biathletes
Olympic biathletes of Argentina
Biathletes at the 1992 Winter Olympics
Place of birth missing (living people)